The sinus venarum (also known as the sinus of the vena cava, or sinus venarum cavarum) is the portion of the right atrium in the adult human heart where the inner surface of the right atrium is smooth. The sinus venarum represents the portion of the adult heart that develops from the right sinus horn of the foetal sinus venosus. The sinus venarum is demarcated from the rest of the (rough trabeculated) inner surface of the right atrium by the crista terminalis.

References 

Cardiac anatomy